Summerset Township is one of seventeen townships in Adair County, Iowa, USA.  At the 2010 census, its population was 996.

History
Summerset Township was organized in 1856.

Geography
According to the USGS, it contains one cemetery, Fontanelle.

References

External links
 US-Counties.com
 City-Data.com

Townships in Adair County, Iowa
Townships in Iowa
1856 establishments in Iowa
Populated places established in 1856